Alberto Jesús "Hijitus" Gómez Franzutti (born 18 March 1950) is a retired Argentine football player.

Career
Gómez began his playing career with Argentine first division club Rosario Central. He made his league debut against Argentinos Juniors in 1968.

In 1972, Gómez joined Liga MX México Primera División side Cruz Azul and made his league debut against Club de Fútbol Laguna on 11 March 1972. He would spend the next seven seasons with Cruz Azul, winning the league three times. hg

References

External links

1950 births
Living people
Argentine footballers
Argentine expatriate footballers
Argentine Primera División players
Liga MX players
Rosario Central footballers
Cruz Azul footballers
San Luis F.C. players
Club Atlético Platense footballers
Expatriate footballers in Mexico
Association football midfielders
Footballers from Rosario, Santa Fe